Arecacicola is a genus of fungi within the Lasiosphaeriaceae family. This is a monotypic genus, containing the single species Arecacicola calami.

References

External links
Arecacicola at Index Fungorum

Lasiosphaeriaceae
Monotypic Sordariomycetes genera